Bruno D. Zumbo is a Canadian mathematical scientist trained in the tradition of research that combines pure and applied mathematics with statistical and algorithmic techniques to develop theory and solve problems arising in measurement, testing, and surveys in the social, behavioral, and health sciences. He is currently Professor and Distinguished University Scholar, the Canada Research Chair in Psychometrics and Measurement (Tier 1), and the Paragon UBC Professor of Psychometrics & Measurement at University of British Columbia.

His research in the mathematical sciences reflects a wide range of research in mathematics and statistics aimed at developing and exploring the properties and applications of mathematical structures of measurement, survey design, testing, and assessment.

Education 
He completed his B.Sc. at the University of Alberta (Edmonton, AB) and his MA and Ph.D. from Carleton University (Ottawa, ON). His doctoral dissertation titled "Statistical Methods to Overcome Nonindependence of Coupled Data in Significance Testing" was under the direction of Donald W. Zimmerman (Carleton University, Ottawa).

Career
Zumbo teaches in the graduate Measurement, Evaluation, & Research Methodology Program with an additional appointment in the Institute of Applied Mathematics, and earlier also in the Department of Statistics, at the University of British Columbia (UBC) in Vancouver, British Columbia, Canada.  Prior to arriving at UBC in 2000, he held professorships in the Departments of Psychology and of Mathematics at the University of Northern British Columbia (1994-2000), and earlier in the Faculty of Education with an adjunct appointment in the Department of Mathematics at the University of Ottawa (1990-1994).

His research interests have been focused on the mathematical sciences of measurement and scientific methodology with a blend of mathematics, social sciences like psychology, philosophy of science and measurement in science.

He is known for his contributions in the fields of statistics, psychometrics, validity theory, and studies of the mathematical basis of classical test theory, item response theory, and measurement error models. His program of research is actively engaged in psychometrics for language testing, quality of life and wellbeing, and health and human development.

Awards and recognition
 Distinguished University Scholar, 2017
 Pioneer in the Psychometrics of Quality of Life, 2018 by the International Society for Quality of Life Studies
 Centenary Medal of Distinction, awarded in 2019 by the UBC School of Nursing
 Paragon UBC Professorship in Psychometrics and Measurement
 Tier 1 - Canada Research Chair in Psychometrics and Measurement, held at the University of British Columbia, awarded in 2020

References

External links 

 List of publications

1966 births
Living people
Academic staff of the University of British Columbia
Canadian mathematicians
Carleton University alumni
University of Alberta alumni